Artsem Karalek (born 20 February 1996) is a Belarusian handball player for Industria Kielce and the Belarusian national team.

He competed both at the 2016 European Men's Handball Championship and the 2020 European Men's Handball Championship.

References

External links

1996 births
Living people
Sportspeople from Grodno
Belarusian male handball players
Expatriate handball players in Poland
Belarusian expatriate sportspeople in France
Belarusian expatriate sportspeople in Poland
Vive Kielce players